The 1954 California lieutenant gubernatorial election was held on November 2, 1954. Incumbent Republican Harold J. Powers defeated Democratic nominee Edward R. Roybal with 55.34% of the vote.

General election

Candidates
Harold J. Powers, Republican
Edward R. Roybal, Democratic

Results

References

California
1954
Lieutenant